Diving is one of the sports contested at the 2022 Commonwealth Games, to be held in Birmingham, England. The sport has been staged in all twenty-one previous editions of the Games thus far, and will be contested in England for the third time.

The competition is scheduled to take place between 4 and 8 August 2022, spread across twelve events, two more than in Gold Coast as mixed-sex 3 metre and 10 metre synchronised events are held for the first time. All individual events shall have preliminaries and finals, while synchronised events will be a straight final.

Schedule
The competition schedule is as follows:

Venue
The diving competition will be held at the Sandwell Aquatics Centre, the only new-build permanent venue constructed for the Games. The swimming competition will also take place there.

Medal summary

Medal table

Medalists

Men

Women

Mixed

Participating nations
There were ten participating Commonwealth Games Associations (CGAs) in diving with a total of 75 athletes (38 men and 37 women). The number of athletes a nation entered is in parentheses beside the name of the country.

References

External links
Official website: 2022 Commonwealth Games – Aquatics - Diving

 
2022
2022 Commonwealth Games events
Diving competitions in the United Kingdom
2022 in diving